The Women's long jump competition at the 1968 Summer Olympics in Mexico City, Mexico took place on October 13–14.

Competition format
The competition consisted of two rounds, qualification and final.  In qualification, each athlete jumped three times.  At least the top twelve athletes (including ties) moved on to the final; if more than twelve reached the qualifying distance, all who did so advanced.  Distances were reset for the final round.  Finalists jumped three times, after which the eight best jumped three more times (with the best distance of the six jumps counted).

Records
Prior to the competition, the existing World and Olympic records were as follows.

Results

Qualifying round

Qual. rule: qualification standard 6.35m (Q) or at least best 12 qualified (q). Ties between jumpers were broken by comparing their second best marks.

Final

References

External links
 Official Olympic Report, la84foundation.org. Retrieved August 16, 2012.

Athletics at the 1968 Summer Olympics
Long jump at the Olympics
1968 in women's athletics
Women's events at the 1968 Summer Olympics